Osama Mohd Fathi Daghles, commonly known by the nickname Sam Daghles (born September 18, 1979), is a Jordanian professional basketball player of Palestinian origin. He currently works as an assistant coach for the Rio Grande Valley Vipers  of the NBA G League.
Born in Taiyuan, Shanxi, he lived in San Diego, California, where he played for James Madison High School.

In 2006, he was selected 4th in the 8th round by the Idaho Stampede of the NBA D-League.

Early career
Daghles started playing basketball at age 14 during visits to local playgrounds. He made the James Madison High School varsity in his first year. 

Daghles met an automobile accident in his early college years. This was before he got involved with a travelling team called High Five America. He won an MVP award  at San Diego Mesa College for his two years in junior college.

Daghles would then receive a scholarship to attend Midwestern State University in his junior year. As a junior in the 2001–2002 season, he averaged 10.1 points, 4.4 rebounds, and 4.5 assists while starting 24 of 26 games.

Pro career 
Daghles started his professional career in 2003 by joining the Fastlink Sports Club team in the Jordanian Basketball League. He would lead Fastlink in securing the 2007 league championship. In addition, Daghles is a two-time MVP of the Jordanian Basketball League for the 2003–04 and 2005–06 seasons. He also was voted best playmaker in the 2006 FIBA Asia Champions Cup for leading his Fastlink team to first place.

In 2006, he was selected 4th in the 8th round by the Idaho Stampede of the NBA D-League.

Daghles is a member of the Jordan national basketball team since 2003. 

Daghles signed with the Talk 'N Text Tropang Texters of the Philippine Basketball Association (PBA) as their Asian import during the 2015 PBA Governors' Cup.

References

External links 
 Player profile at Asia-Basket.com
 Player profile at 2012 FIBA World Olympic Qualifying Tournament.
 Player profile at 2011 FIBA Asia Championship (FIBA website).
 Player profile at 2011 FIBA Asia Championship (FIBA Asia website).
 Player profile at 2010 FIBA World Championship.

1979 births
Living people
2010 FIBA World Championship players
American emigrants to Jordan
American expatriate basketball people in China
American expatriate basketball people in Jordan
American expatriate basketball people in the Philippines
American men's basketball players
American people of Palestinian descent
Applied Science University basketball players
Basketball coaches from California
Basketball players from San Diego
Jilin Northeast Tigers players
Jordanian men's basketball players
Jordanian people of Palestinian descent
Junior college men's basketball players in the United States
Midwestern State Mustangs men's basketball players
Philippine Basketball Association imports
Point guards
Rio Grande Valley Vipers coaches
Shooting guards
TNT Tropang Giga players
Zain Club basketball players
Jordanian expatriate basketball people in the Philippines